The Burkina Faso men's national under-18 basketball team is a national basketball team of Burkina Faso, governed by the Fédération Burkinabe de Basketball.
It represents the country in international under-18 (under age 18) basketball competitions.

Its last appearance was at the 2014 FIBA Africa Under-18 Championship qualification stage.

See also
Burkina Faso men's national basketball team
Burkina Faso men's national under-16 basketball team
Burkina Faso women's national under-18 basketball team

References

External links
Archived records of Burkina Faso team participations

Basketball teams in Burkina Faso
Men's national under-18 basketball teams
Basketball